The freshwater butterflyfish or African butterflyfish, Pantodon buchholzi, is the only extant species in the family Pantodontidae within the order Osteoglossiformes. It is not closely related to saltwater butterflyfishes.

Description and habits

It has a large and well-vascularized swim bladder, enabling it to breathe air at the surface of the water. It is carnivorous, feeding primarily on aquatic insects and smaller fishes.

The freshwater butterflyfish is a specialized surface hunter. Its eyes are constantly trained to the surface and its upturned mouth is specifically adapted to capture small prey along the water's surface. If enough speed is built up in the water, a butterflyfish can jump and glide a small distance above the surface to avoid predation. It also wiggles its pectoral fins as it glides, with the help of specialized, enlarged pectoral muscles, the ability which earned the fish its common name.

When freshwater butterflyfish spawn, they produce a mass of large floating eggs at the surface. Fertilisation is believed to be internal. Eggs hatch in about seven days.

Distribution

Freshwater butterflyfish are found in the slightly acidic, standing bodies of water in West Africa. They are found in slow- to no-current areas with high amounts of surface foliage for cover. They are commonly seen in Lake Chad, the Congo Basin, throughout lower Niger, Cameroon, Ogooue, and upper Zambezi. They have also been seen in the Niger Delta, lower Ogooue, and in the lower Cross River.

In the aquarium

Freshwater butterflyfish are kept in large aquaria, although a single specimen should be kept as the only top-level fish, as they can be aggressive to their own kind and others at surface level. The tops of the tanks must be tightly closed because of their jumping habits. They do better in a tank with live plants, especially ones that float near the surface, providing hiding places to reduce stress. They require a pH of 6.9–7.1, and a KH of 1–10. In aquaria, freshwater butterflyfish can grow to 5 in. They should not be kept with fin-eating or aggressive fish. They eat any fish small enough to fit in their mouths, so they should be maintained with bottom-dwelling fish or top- and mid-dwelling fish too large in size to be bothered by them. They generally will not eat prepared food, and do best on a diet of live or possibly canned crickets and other insects, as well as live, gut-loaded feeder fish (goldfish should be avoided). They prefer still water, so filtration should not be too powerful.

See also
Flying and gliding animals
List of freshwater aquarium fish species

References

Bibliography
 
 
 Innes, Dr William T., Exotic Aquarium Fishes, Innes Publishing Co. Philadelphia, 1935

Osteoglossiformes
Freshwater fish of Africa
Fish described in 1877
Taxa named by Wilhelm Peters